Raymond Romain, Comte de Sèze or Desèze (26 September 17502 May 1828) was a French advocate. Together with François Tronchet and Malesherbes, he defended Louis XVI, when the king was brought before the Convention for trial.

Life
Raymond de Sèze was born in Bordeaux, Aquitaine, and studied in the famous law school of that city.  He gained a reputation for remarkable passion and persuasiveness, and came to prominence in 1789 when he defended the Baron de Bensenval against charges of high treason.

When, at forty-four, he was called out of retirement to aid the last push of Louis XVI's defence, he was considered one of the best lawyers in the kingdom. Though he had to prepare his defence arguments in a short amount of time, his brilliance shone through in a first draft that, although moving, Louis rejected as too rhetorical, saying, "I do not want to play on their (the Convention's) feelings". When the time for the real defence came, despite having had no sleep for over four days, he pleaded the king's case for three hours, arguing eloquently yet discreetly that the revolution spare his life. Beginning with a description of why the charges were invalid (under the terms of the constitution of 1791 Louis, as king, was immune from prosecution), he attacked the right of Convention to stand as judge and jury. Finally, he moved to a rejection of the charges in the acte enonciatif drawn up by the constitution charge by charge, with a royalist history of the revolution, portraying Louis as 'the restorer of French Liberty". He finished, like many of the set-piece speeches of the revolution, with an appeal to history:

Jean-Paul Marat, the démagogue of the sans-culottes, was favourably impressed, and declared: "de Séze read a long speech made with a great deal of art". The Commune, the most violent of the factions at the time, described the speech as "very adroit". Nevertheless, the case was lost, and the king was sent to the guillotine.

de Sèze himself was also imprisoned during the revolution, but he managed to elude the scaffold. After release upon the fall of Robespierre, he disappeared from public life, serving neither the Directory nor the Napoleonic government, both of which he saw as illegitimate. Upon the return of the Bourbons he was made a peer, as well as a judge and a member of the French Academy, before dying at the age of seventy eight.

References
The King's Trial (Louis XVI vs The French Revolution), David P. Jordan, University of California Press, Twenty-Fifth Anniversary Edition. Copyright 1979, 2004

1750 births
1828 deaths
Lawyers from Bordeaux
Members of the Chamber of Peers of the Bourbon Restoration
18th-century French lawyers
Deeze, Raymond
Members of the Académie Française
Burials at Père Lachaise Cemetery
State ministers of France
19th-century French judges